William Caulfield  is a writer, actor, comedian and TV performer from Northern Ireland He has achieved popularity through his TV, radio and theatre shows.

Personal life
He was educated at Kings Park Primary, Lurgan Junior High School and  Lurgan College

Career
His popularity began on BBC Radio Ulster in 1991 when he began writing and broadcasting humorous monologues as The Bard of Tyrone.  Over a period of six years he wrote and performed over 200 poems. As a direct result of this he was asked to appear at the Belfast Festival at Queen's University Belfast (QUB) and on the BBC Radio Ulster programme, Laugh a Minute.
 
Caulfield became one of the busiest warm up men for both BBC and UTV on shows such as The Kelly Show Get it Right Next Time, Town Challenge, The Daniel O'Donnell Show, Give my Head Peace, Saints and Scholars, Scots Irish Evenings and The 11+ Show.
 
He has appeared on The Gerry Kelly Show, McKeever Show and All Mixed Up for UTV and Pass it On, Town Challenge and The Big Science Quiz for the BBC. He interviewed  Jade Goody for Channel 4 in What Jade Did Next.

He then made a decision to stop doing warm up and concentrate on making his own shows for television and radio. This resulted in An Evening with James Young and a four-part series Our William,  both on BBC 1 NI.  Most recently for BBC Radio Ulster he co-wrote and starred in  It's William Caulfield- so it is, a sketch based comedy series for Radio Ulster, nominated for a PPI Radio Award, William Caulfield's Workers Party which was recorded in various factories around the province. Caulfield was Team Captain on the comedy panel show Either/Or.
 
Caulfield is well established in theatre playing Nathan Detroit in Guys and Dolls, Henry Higgins in My Fair Lady, Ebenezer Scrooge in A Christmas Carol and Frank in Annie Get Your Gun, all for Enniskillen's Light Operatic Society. Other stage roles include Look Who's Talking, Da and Playboy of the Western World.
 
He has appeared in Pantomime in Belfast in the Waterfront Hall (2001–2003), Grand Opera House (2004–2005) and the Millennium Forum Derry (2006-2021)

As a busy stand up comedian he has toured around the region with a brand new version of his ‘’Our Jimmy’’show every year since 2000 using material that is modern and family friendly. 
He also works regularly around the world as a guest entertainer and headline act onboard various luxury cruise ships.

References

External links 
William Caulfield's official website
Grand Opera House, Belfast

1959 births
Living people
Male television actors from Northern Ireland
People educated at Lurgan College
People from Lurgan
Male musical theatre actors from Northern Ireland
Stand-up comedians from Northern Ireland
Male comedians from Northern Ireland
Comedy writers from Northern Ireland
21st-century comedians from Northern Ireland